A bucket shop was an unlicensed tavern in 19th-century London that sold discarded alcohol.

It also refers to:
 a business engaged in heraldic fraud, the sale of illegitimate heraldic credentials
 bucket shop (stock market), a sham brokerage that does not execute trades as claimed
 an airline consolidator that specializes in multi-stop trips